Ana Zaninović (born 26 June 1987, in Split) is a Croatian taekwondo practitioner. She is the twin sister of taekwondo practitioner Lucija Zaninović.

At the 2007 World Taekwondo Championships in Beijing, Zaninović won the silver medal in the women's flyweight class. Zaninović won the gold medal in the women's bantamweight class at the 2011 World Taekwondo Championships in Gyeongju. Zaninović qualified for the 2012 Summer Olympics after winning the bronze medal in the women's 57 kg class at the 2011 World Taekwondo Olympic Qualification Tournament held in Baku. She defeated Mayu Hamada in a match in which Zaninović suffered a broken fist in the third round but held on and won with the golden point in the fourth overtime round. At the 2012 European Taekwondo Championships in Manchester, she won the silver medal in the women's bantamweight class after losing to Hatice Kübra Yangın in the sudden death round. At the 2012 Summer Olympics, she was defeated in the preliminary round by Mayu Hamada.

References

External links

1987 births
Sportspeople from Split, Croatia
Croatian female taekwondo practitioners
Taekwondo practitioners at the 2012 Summer Olympics
Taekwondo practitioners at the 2016 Summer Olympics
Living people
Croatian twins
Twin sportspeople
Olympic taekwondo practitioners of Croatia
Taekwondo practitioners at the 2015 European Games
European Games medalists in taekwondo
European Games silver medalists for Croatia
World Taekwondo Championships medalists
European Taekwondo Championships medalists
21st-century Croatian women